The Owensmouth Line was a Pacific Electric interurban service that connected the San Fernando Valley to Downtown Los Angeles. The route was largely developed as the result of real estate speculation.

History

The Pacific Electric streetcar service to Owensmouth (present day Canoga Park) was part of a real estate development in Southern California. Nearly the entire southern San Fernando Valley was bought in 1910 by the Los Angeles Suburban Homes Co., owned by a syndicate of wealthy Los Angeles investors, developers, and speculators: including Harrison Gray Otis, Harry Chandler, Moses Sherman, Hobart Johnstone Whitley, and others. It anticipated possible connections to, but was planned independent of, the soon to be completed (1913) Los Angeles Aqueduct from the Owens River watershed to the City of Los Angeles through the San Fernando Valley in Los Angeles County.

To help promote sales of the land, General Moses Sherman's Los Angeles Pacific Railroad set off to build a streetcar line across the San Fernando Valley, to serve the three plotted new towns: Van Nuys (1911); Marion (now Reseda); and Owensmouth (now Canoga Park) (1912). At the time, streetcar lines were seen as a necessity to promote development. Los Angeles Pacific Railroad later sold the line to the Pacific Electric. The line opened to Van Nuys on December 16, 1911, extending to Owensmouth on December 7 the following year.

Owensmouth was named in classic real estate "boosterism", as 'nearest' the outlet-'mouth' of the Owens River Aqueduct and echoing English and New England town names such as Falmouth, Yarmouth, and Plymouth. The controversy of Valley land speculation and the aqueduct brought the community to change its name from Owensmouth to Canoga Park in 1931, after the Southern Pacific "Canoga" station there. The name of the Pacific Electric line was unchanged as Owensmouth until the demise of through service.

The route originally navigated the Cahuenga Pass in its own right of way on the west side of the state highway. When the Hollywood Freeway was built, the line was relocated to the freeway's median strip.

Services were truncated to North Sherman Way on June 1, 1938, and finally replaced by buses on December 28, 1952. Unlike other lines which saw a decrease in service after World War II, ridership greatly increased in the service's final years.

A survey conducted by Caltrans in 1981 reported that almost all of the line had either been removed or paved over for street use.

G Line

In the 2000s a new cross-Valley rapid transit line was built: the Metro Orange Line, a dedicated bus transit-way which uses part of the old Pacific Electric right-of-way (Chandler Blvd. east of Ethel Ave.) and the former Southern Pacific south and west Valley route (from White Oak Avenue to the Chatsworth station). Service commenced in 2005; it was renamed to the G Line in 2020.

Route
Leaving Downtown on the same tracks as the Hollywood Line, the line continues along the Sherman Line at Sunset Junction before turning north at Highland. The line continued on its own private right of way though the Cahuenga Pass, turning up Vineland Avenue through North Hollywood, and onto Chandler Boulevard. Proceeding west to the curve onto Van Nuys Boulevard, it ran through Van Nuys to a curve (Sherman Circle) off of Van Nuys Boulevard turning west onto Sherman Way to Owensmouth. On Shoup Avenue, named after Pacific Electric president Paul Shoup, the center was used as its end of the line sidings.

List of major stations

Ridership

See also
Picover station
East San Fernando Light Rail Transit Project

References

External links

Map of the Pacific Electric Railway Routes in the San Fernando Valley (1919) — via Barry Lawrence Ruderman Antique Maps Inc.

Pacific Electric routes
Canoga Park, Los Angeles
History of the San Fernando Valley
Public transportation in the San Fernando Valley
Reseda, Los Angeles
West Hills, Los Angeles
Winnetka, Los Angeles
Railway services introduced in 1911
Railway services discontinued in 1952
1911 establishments in California
1952 disestablishments in California
Railway lines in highway medians
Closed railway lines in the United States